Nikita Mikhailovich Melnikov (born 28 February 1997) is a Russian football player who plays for Slutsk .

Club career
He made his debut in the Russian Professional Football League for FC Strogino Moscow on 7 April 2018 in a game against FC Zorky Krasnogorsk.

References

External links
 Profile by Russian Professional Football League
 
 

1997 births
Footballers from Moscow
Living people
Russian footballers
Association football forwards
Russian expatriate footballers
Expatriate footballers in Belarus
Belarusian Premier League players
FC Torpedo Moscow players
FC Arsenal Tula players
FC Strogino Moscow players
FC Saturn Ramenskoye players
FC Slavia Mozyr players
FC Arsenal Dzerzhinsk players
FC Slutsk players